Jacqueline Ann Beere  is an English educator. From 2003 to 2006 she was Headteacher at Campion School in Bugbrooke, Northamptonshire.

Qualifications

Jackie Beere became an Advanced Skills Teacher in 1999. She is also a qualified Master Neurolinguistic Programmer, an AST and Excellent Teacher accredited assessor and was an Associate Tutor for the University of Leicester for the MBA course.

Honoured

In 2002 Beere received an OBE for services to education for her work in developing Learning to Learn initiatives and for leading national training for ASTs.

Headteacher

Beere became Headteacher of Campion School in 2003. This large comprehensive school achieved a very good OFSTED report under her leadership in 2004. It was described as "very effective with excellent features. The dynamic focus by the Headteacher ...on improving learning is proving very effective in raising standards and has achieved local and national recognition".

Beere continued to develop curriculum innovations at the school, including introducing the RSA Opening Minds competency-based curriculum.

Writings

Beere has written several publications linked to transforming learning and has written a book aimed at helping students learn how to learn. She has written several books for teachers including The Perfect Lesson, The Perfect Teacher and The Perfect Teacher Coach as well as editing the Crown House Perfect series of books aimed at supporting teachers to deliver outstanding learning in classrooms. Her latest book The growth mindset edge: your guide to developing grit was published in 2016.

References

External links
 Official site
 Channel 4 interview with Jackie Beere

Year of birth missing (living people)
Living people
Officers of the Order of the British Empire
Schoolteachers from Northamptonshire
Academics of the University of Leicester